Glycon of Croton was an ancient Greek athlete listed by Eusebius of Caesarea as a victor in the stadion race of the 48th Olympiad (588 BC). He was the first winner from Magna Graecia. Pausanias relates his name as Glaukias.

References

See also 
Olympic winners of the Stadion race

6th-century BC Greek people
Ancient Olympic competitors
Ancient Greek runners
Ancient Crotonian athletes